Invesdor is an equity-based crowdfunding platform based in Helsinki, Finland. The company was founded in May 2012. Invesdor has been reported as being the first equity-based crowdfunding service in Northern Europe. It operates as a matching service between investors and companies.

Since its founding, 64 million euros have been invested in growth companies via Invesdor. So far 133 companies have successfully raised funding giving success rate of 73%. The average pre-money valuation is 2.5M euros offering on average from 9% to 17% of equity. There is an average of 170 investors per round, investing on average 2,900 euros each. There are also many angel investments in the amounts of 40,000/50,000 euros.

History
Invesdor was launched in May 2012, by Lasse Mäkelä (currently the CEO of the company), Miikka Poutiainen, Petteri Poutiainen, Timo Lappi, Jouni Leskinen and Lare Lekman.

In April and May 2013, it was announced that two Finnish wealth management companies had invested in Invesdor: Taaleritehdas and Alexandria (wealth management company).

In August 2013 Invesdor took part in a 2-day pitching event in Kuusisaari, Oulu.

In November 2013 Invesdor was an organizing partner in the event PitchHelsinki, held in Helsinki City Hall. Invesdor ran the first live crowdfunding event during PitchHelsinki, allowing the startups to be posted on the website in order to be crowdfunded from the investors attending the event and from those all around the world. At the end of the event, in just 16 hours, one (PlayMySong) of the four startups presented by Invesdor successfully closed its round with 25,000 euros (125% of the minimum target) raised from 35 investors.

In January 2014 Invesdor and Privanet, a Finnish company focusing on trading of unlisted shares, set up a partnership to offer a secondary market for crowdfunded offerings. The trading of the shares will start in spring 2014 and the partnership will allow both Finnish and international investors to sell and buy crowdfunded shares in a secondary market, in order to have an easy exit from their investments.

In March 2014, Invesdor and other Nordic companies in the crowdfunding field (Booomerang, Mesenaatti, Karolina Fund and bidra.no) launched the Nordic Crowdfunding Alliance in cooperation with the School of Business and Law of the University of Agder. The aim of the alliance is to help young entrepreneurs in the Nordic region to raise money for their ideas, matching them with possible investors.

In April 2014 Invesdor was chosen by Red Herring (magazine) as one of the 100 most promising companies and entrepreneurs in Europe for the year 2014. Invesdor is the only crowdfunding platform listed by Red Herring for the year 2014.

In June 2014, Invesdor successfully closed a crowdfunding round through its own platform raising a total of 290,871 euros from 135 investors from 13 different countries. This round was opened in hidden mode, only allowing the people who have already invested through the platform to invest in it. Invesdor received 121 new shareholders as a result of the round.

In April 2015 Invesdor became the first fully licensed (MiFID) equity crowdfunding platform in Europe. Invesdor's license is fully passportable across the EEA.

Operation model 
Invesdor focuses on equity crowdfunding for startups and growth companies. Finnish, Swedish, Danish, Norwegian and UK companies can raise up to 2.5 million euros through Invesdor, while investments can come from anywhere in the world. The minimum for each investment is 20 euros.

The service follows the “All-or-Nothing” model, in which pledged funds are only collected from the investors if the minimum goal set by the company being funded is reached by the end of the crowdfunding campaign.

The company seeks to position their service as a low-threshold option by having a low minimum investment and a general scarcity of paperwork during the process.

Regulation
The Finnish legislation surrounding donations- and reward-based crowdfunding differs from that of most of Europe, which makes donation-based crowdfunding impossible and complicates reward-based crowdfunding in Finland. However, these issues don’t apply to equity-based crowdfunding, as the legislation around it is more similar to that of the rest of Europe.

Invesdor is reported to be the first equity crowdfunding platform in Europe to have secured a fully passportable MiFID Investment Firm license.

Successful projects
 Invesdor counts 115 successful rounds with 54 million euros raised:

NetOutlet, in August 2012, was Invesdor's first successful project. NetOutlet is an online outlet store and it raised 50,000 euros from 1 investor via Invesdor.
Climbstation, a Finnish company in the sports equipment industry, successfully concluded its round in February 2013 with more than 64,000 euros raised from 46 investors in less than two months.
Bryggeri, a brewery located in Helsinki city center, is one of Invesdor's successful projects with more than 600,000 euros raised through their first round in June 2013; they also decided to open a second round in July 2013 through the same platform.
RF SenseIT raised more than 159,000 euros from 1 external investor.
gTie, in September 2013, managed to raise more than 288,000 euros using Invesdor's service.
Suppilo, in October 2013, managed to raise more than 130,000 euros from 38 investors.
Dikital with a project called "Instagram for videos", successfully closed its round in November 2013 raising 13,800 euros.
iResponse successfully closed its round early due to oversubscription. The company raised more than 80,000 euros.
Hawina Productions, a Finnish company making language learning games, raised more than 35,000 euros from 58 investors in January 2014.
PlayMySong, during PitchHelsinki, successfully closed its round in 16 hours, raising 25,000 euros from 35 investors. Then, PlayMySong decided to create another crowdfunding round via Invesdor and, in January 2014, the company raised more than 20,000 euros from 15 investors.
Iron Sky Universe, the company behind the science fiction action movie Iron Sky decided to raise money through Invesdor to set up an Iron Sky franchise (movie, game, TV series). In May 2014 Iron Sky closed its round with 265,800 euros raised from 421 investors. The company managed to successfully close its round raising 532% of its minimum target in ten days. Iron Sky Universe successfully exceeded 300% of its minimum goal in less than 24 hours.
Pyynikin käsityöläispanimo (Pyynikki Craft Brewery), a brewery located in Tampere, successfully closed its round in May 2014 raising more than 243,200 euros from 173 investors.
Hakala Performance, a company which core business is rebuilding muscle cars, successfully closed its round in July 2014 raising 82,200 euros from 36 investors.
HIFK Fotboll, a Finnish football team that is currently in the second highest Finnish national division (1st division), successfully closed its round in February 2015 raising 346, 392 euros from 786 investors.
Bittiraha.fi, a company with the largest network of bitcoin ATMs in the Nordics as well as a bitcoin web store called BTC Store, successfully closed its round in May 2015 raising 227,203 euros from 268 investors.
Cityvarasto, the largest self-storage company in Finland with locations in the major cities in Finland, successfully closed its round in June 2015 raising 1,008,385 euros from 339 investors.

See also
Comparison of crowd funding services

References

External links

Equity crowdfunding platforms
Online financial services companies of Finland